The Italian submarine Acciaio was the name ship of her class of submarines built for the Royal Italian Navy (Regia Marina) during World War II.

Design and description
The Acciaio-class submarines were designed as improved versions of the preceding . They displaced  surfaced and  submerged.

For surface running, the boats were powered by two  diesel engines, each driving one propeller shaft. When submerged each propeller was driven by a  electric motor. They could reach  on the surface and  underwater.

The boats were armed with six internal  torpedo tubes, four in the bow and two in the stern. They were also armed with one  deck gun for combat on the surface. The light anti-aircraft armament varied and could consist of one or two  or one or two pairs of  machine guns.

Construction and career
Acciaio was built in OTO's shipyard at Muggiano. She was laid down on 21 November 1940 and launched on 22 January 1941. She was commissioned on 30 October of the same year. The name Acciaio means "Steel" in Italian. The boat’s first patrol was on 29 March 1942 and she carried out nine offensive patrols during her service career, against Allied naval forces in the Mediterranean. She had one success, when she sank the British armed trawler  on 7 February 1943 off the Algerian coast. Her last patrol was on 10 July from La Maddalena to act against Allied forces involved in Operation Husky, the invasion of Sicily. On 13 July 1943, Acciaio was sunk by the  British submarine  with the loss of her entire crew of 46.

Notes

References

External links
 Acciaio at regiamarina.net

Acciaio-class submarines
1941 ships
Ships built by OTO Melara
Ships built in La Spezia
World War II submarines of Italy
Maritime incidents in July 1943
World War II shipwrecks in the Mediterranean Sea
Ships sunk by British submarines
Ships lost with all hands
Submarines sunk by submarines